Guanidine nitrate is the chemical compound with the formula [C(NH2)3]NO3.  It is a colorless, water-soluble salt.  It is produced on a large scale and finds use as precursor for nitroguanidine, fuel in pyrotechnics  and gas generators.  Its correct name is guanidinium nitrate, but the colloquial term guanidine nitrate is widely used.

Production and properties
Although it is the salt formed by neutralizing guanidine with nitric acid, guanidine nitrate is produced industrially by the reaction of dicyandiamide (or calcium salt) and ammonium nitrate. 

It has been used as a monopropellant in the Jetex engine for model airplanes. It is attractive because it has a high gas output and low flame temperature. It has a relatively high monopropellant specific impulse of 177 seconds (1.7 kN·s/kg).

Guanidine nitrate's explosive decomposition is given by the following equation:
H6N4CO3 (s) -> 3 H2O (g) + 2 N2 (g) + C (s)

Applications 
Guanidine nitrate is used as the gas generator in automobile airbags. It is less toxic than the mixture used in older airbags of sodium azide, potassium nitrate and silica (NaN3, KNO3, and SiO2), and it is less explosive and sensitive to moisture compared to the very cheap ammonium nitrate (NH4NO3).

Safety
The compound is a hazardous substance, being an explosive and containing an oxidant (nitrate).  It is also harmful to the eyes, skin, and respiratory tract.

Notes

External links
Jetex: Propellants
PhysChem: Guanidine Nitrate  MSDS

Guanidinium compounds
Nitrates
Rocket fuels
Explosive chemicals